Sheep Mountain is a  mountain summit of the Saint Elias Mountains, in Kluane National Park of Yukon, Canada. It is known as Thechàl Dhâl by the Southern Tutchone people, meaning "Skin Scraper Mountain", referring to the thechàl, a flat stone scraper that was used to prepare animal hides. Sheep Mountain is habitat for Dall sheep, and was once a favorite sheep hunting area for the Southern Tutchone before the park was established. The mountain can be climbed via an  loop which gains 1,310 meters of elevation, part of which is on the Sheep Creek Trail, one of the most popular hikes in Kluane Park. The route provides good opportunities to see Dall sheep, which the mountain is named for.

Climate

Based on the Köppen climate classification, Sheep Mountain is located in a subarctic climate zone with long, cold, winters, and short, cool summers. Temperatures can drop below −30 °C with wind chill factors below −50 °C. The months June through August offer the most favorable weather for viewing and climbing. Precipitation runoff from the mountain drains east into Kluane Lake, the largest lake contained entirely within Yukon.

See also

List of mountains of Canada
Geography of Yukon

Gallery

References

External links
 Parks Canada website: Kluane
 Weather forecast

One-thousanders of Yukon
Saint Elias Mountains
Kluane National Park and Reserve